Thomas Chaffyn (by 1519–1559) was an English politician.

Family
Chaffyn was the son of Salisbury MP Thomas Chaffyn. He married Sybil South, the daughter of Salisbury MP, Robert South.

Career
In 1547, he was Mayor of Salisbury. He was a Member (MP) of the Parliament of England for Heytesbury in November 1554 and Salisbury in 1555.

References

1559 deaths
English MPs 1554–1555
Year of birth uncertain
English MPs 1555
Mayors of Salisbury